Mill House, also known as Chinn's Mill and Hatcher's Mill, is a historic grist mill complex located near Middleburg, Fauquier County, Virginia. All of the buildings in the complex are constructed of stone laid in a random-rubble pattern and some are of mixed stone and frame construction.  They represent a late 18th- to early 19th-century rural Virginia grist mill operation, that was later transformed during the early-20th-century into a "hunt country" estate by John Shaffer Phipps.  In addition to the mill itself, the complex includes the miller's house, the cooper's house and shop, the mill owner's house, and what was likely a dairy/smokehouse.

It was listed on the National Register of Historic Places in 1984.

References

Grinding mills on the National Register of Historic Places in Virginia
Houses on the National Register of Historic Places in Virginia
Industrial buildings completed in 1800
Houses in Fauquier County, Virginia
National Register of Historic Places in Fauquier County, Virginia
Grinding mills in Virginia